Moonflower may refer to:

Plants 
A common name for several night-blooming plants, some with white flowers, including:
 Several night-blooming cereus species
Selenicereus (moonlight cactus) and its species, including those formerly placed in Hylocereus
Strophocactus wittii (Amazon moonflower)
 Datura species
Datura innoxia
 Ipomoea species previously separated in Calonyction
Ipomoea alba
 Mentzelia species
Mentzelia pumila
 Oenothera (evening primrose)

Books
The Moon Flower, a science fiction serial aired in 1953 G K Saunders
Moon-Flower, by Zoë Akins, adapted from a Hungarian play by Lajos Bíró.

Music 
 Moonflowers (band)
 Moonflower (album), a 1977 album by Carlos Santana
 "Flor d'Luna (Moonflower)", the track from the album
 Moon Flower (album), a 2008 album by The Underneath
 "Moonflower", a song from Mark Heard's 1983 album Eye of the Storm
 "Moonflower", a song by Schiller from the 2008 single "Time for Dreams"
 "Moonflowers", a song sung by Dorothy Lamour in the 1952 film Road to Bali 
 "Moon Flower", a song by Kitaro from Spiritual Garden
 "Tsukihana" (Japanese: moonflower), a Japanese song by Nana Kitade
 "月の花 Tsuki no hana" ("Moon Flower"), a Japanese song by Jinn from Qualia

Other 
 A representative of one specific class of Intelligent lights
 The callsign of Italian airline Neos
 Fictional characters from the Hasbro animated series Hanazuki: Full of Treasures